Anísio Souza Silva (born 18 June 1969 in São Paulo) is a retired triple jumper from Brazil, who won the silver medal in the men's triple jump at the 1991 Pan American Games in Havana, Cuba. He represented his native country at two consecutive Summer Olympics, starting in 1992.

Achievements

References

 
 
 

1969 births
Living people
Athletes from São Paulo
Brazilian male triple jumpers
Athletes (track and field) at the 1991 Pan American Games
Athletes (track and field) at the 1995 Pan American Games
Athletes (track and field) at the 1992 Summer Olympics
Athletes (track and field) at the 1996 Summer Olympics
Olympic athletes of Brazil
Pan American Games medalists in athletics (track and field)
Pan American Games silver medalists for Brazil
Medalists at the 1991 Pan American Games